Francesco Vitiello (born August 15, 1981)  is an Italian actor.  He was born in Torre del Greco in the Province of Naples.

Filmography

Theatre 

 I veri figli di Filomena M, regia di Enrico Maria Lamanna (1997)
 Corpus Cristi, regia di Enrico Maria Lamanna (1998)
 Se cantar mi fai d'amore, regia di Enrico Maria Lamanna (1999)
 Il letto, regia di Pino L'Abbate (2002)
 La capra, regia di Enrico Maria Lamanna (2004)
 Il cielo di Palestina, regia di Carlo Cerciello (2007)

Cinema 

 Capo Nord, soggetto, sceneggiatura e regia di Carlo Luglio (2002) - Opera prima
 Nemici per la pelle, opera prima di Rossella Drudi (2006)
 Viva Franconi, regia di Luca Verdone (2006)
 Liberarsi - Figli di una rivoluzione minore, opera prima di Salvatore Romano (2008)
 I petali dell'aurora, opera prima di Valerio Tramontano - Girato nel 2007

Television 

 Un posto al sole, registi vari - Soap opera - Rai Tre (1996-2002 e 2006-2009) - Ruolo: Diego Giordano
 Distretto di Polizia 4, regia di Monica Vullo e Riccardo Mosca - Serie TV - Canale 5 (2003) - Ruolo: Agente scelto Corrado Esposito
 Un posto al sole d'estate, registi vari - Soap opera - Rai Tre (2007) - Ruolo: Diego Giordano

References

Italian male actors
1981 births
Living people
People from Torre del Greco